Piotr Markiewicz (born 23 September 1973 in Sejny, Podlaskie) is a Polish sprint canoeist who competed from the early 1990s to the early 2000s (decade). At the 1996 Summer Olympics in Atlanta, he won the bronze medal in the K-1 500 m event.

Known for his devastating sprint finish, Markiewicz won his first national champion 1993. Initially representing in the K-4 event, he won two medals in the K-4 events at the ICF Canoe Sprint World Championships with silvers in 1993 (K-4 10000 m) and 1994 (K-4 1000 m).

Markiewicz's personality better suited him to the individual K-1 events where he won the K-1 200 m and K-1 500 m events at the 1995

As reigning world champion, he went to the 1996 Games as favorite in the K-1 500 m event, but did not live up to expectations. Markiewicz ended up settling for bronze in the K-1 500 m event after finishing fourth in the K-4 1000 m event.

After the Olympics, he won his last medal in 1999 with a silver medal in the K-4 200 m event. Markiewicz retired in 2001 after a car accident.

Markiewicz was a member of the Sparta Augustów club. He is 184 cm (6'0") tall and raced at 84 kg (185 lbs).

For his sport achievements, he received: 
 Silver Cross of Merit in 1996.

References

Photo 1
Poish Canoe Federation profile and interview 
Sports-reference.com profile

1973 births
Canoeists at the 1996 Summer Olympics
Living people
Olympic bronze medalists for Poland
Olympic canoeists of Poland
Polish male canoeists
Olympic medalists in canoeing
People from Sejny County
ICF Canoe Sprint World Championships medalists in kayak
Sportspeople from Podlaskie Voivodeship
Medalists at the 1996 Summer Olympics